The Egyptian Women's Premier League is the top flight of women's association football in Egypt. The competition is run by the Egyptian Football Association.

History
The championship was created in 1998. Maaden LFC won the first championship as well as the next three. The competition was stopped from 2003 to 2007. The championship was dominated after by Wadi Degla with ten consecutive titles from 2008 to 2018. The championship will be abandoned during the 2010–2011 season due to the Egyptian revolution of 2011 but returned one season after.

Champions
The list of champions and runners-up:

Most successful clubs 

 Rq:
Goldi LSC (ex. El Maaden LSC)

See also
 Egyptian Women's Cup

References

External links 
 EFA official website

 
Women's association football leagues in Africa
Women's football competitions in Egypt
Women
1998 establishments in Egypt
Sports leagues established in 1998
Football